Clary may refer to:

Places
 Clary, Nord, France, a commune
 Clary, Virginia, United States, an unincorporated community
 Palazzo Clary, a palace in Venice, Italy

Plants
A common name of plants in the sage genus, Salvia, notably:
biennial clary or just clary Salvia sclarea
annual clary Salvia viridis
Balkan clary Salvia nemorosa
meadow clary Salvia pratensis
silvery clary Salvia argentea
sticky clary Salvia glutinosa
whorled clary Salvia verticillata
wild clary Salvia verbenacea

People
 Clary (surname), a list of people
 Clarence Clary Anderson (1911–1988), American football and baseball player and coach
 Clary Hood Smith (1928-2019), American politician

Other uses
 , a number of ships with this name
 Clary Fray, the fictional main character of the book series The Mortal Instruments

See also
 Clary und Aldringen, an Austro-Hungarian princely family of Bohemian noble origin
 Clarrie, a list of people with the given name